St. John's Evangelical Lutheran Church (St. John Lutheran Church) is a congregation of the Evangelical Lutheran Church in America in Passaic, Passaic County, New Jersey, United States. It is noted for its historic church at 140 Lexington Avenue, which was built in 1896 and added to the National Register of Historic Places in 1982.

St. John's was founded by German immigrants in 1891. The congregation met first at the Grand Army Hall, and later at Reisel's hall, and as membership grew rapidly, land was secured and a design developed by Ludwig Becker and executed by Ludwig Kick.

See also
National Register of Historic Places listings in Passaic County, New Jersey

References

External links

 

Lutheran churches in New Jersey
Churches in Passaic, New Jersey
Churches on the National Register of Historic Places in New Jersey
Churches completed in 1896
19th-century Episcopal church buildings
Churches in Passaic County, New Jersey
National Register of Historic Places in Passaic County, New Jersey
New Jersey Register of Historic Places
Religious organizations established in 1891